The Hoosier Crossroads Conference is a member conference of the Indiana High School Athletic Association. Teams first competed in the conference in the 2000-2001 school year. The HCC contains eight high schools in the Indianapolis Metropolitan Area. There are two schools in Hendricks County, one in Boone County, four in Hamilton County, and one in Marion County.

Member schools
All schools are 6A in football.  3A in soccer, and 4A in all other class sports.

Membership timeline

History
The conference started in 2000, as the West division of the Olympic Conference (Brownsburg, Hamilton Southeastern, Harrison, McCutcheon, and Noblesville) joined with two schools from the folding Rangeline Conference (Westfield and Zionsville) and one from the Mid-State Conference (Avon). Lafayette Jeff joined in 2004 from the North Central Conference, and Fishers joined upon reopening in 2006.

In December 2012, the Indianapolis-area schools met and voted to cut ties with the Tippecanoe County schools after the 2013-14 school year due to transportation costs, travel time, differences in school size and competitive balance. The Lafayette area schools joined the  North Central Conference.

In March 2017, the conference schools met to decide on letting an eighth member into the conference, Franklin Central. On March 15, 2017 the HCC decided to admit the Franklin Central Flashes into the HCC in the 2018-2019 school year.

State Champions
IHSAA State Champions

Avon Orioles (7)
 2009 Boys' Golf
 2012 Volleyball (4A)
 2013 Girls' Soccer (2A)
 2013 Volleyball (4A)
 2016 Softball (4A)
 2017 Volleyball (4A)
 2018 Boys' Track

Brownsburg Bulldogs (5)
 1984 Football (3A)
 1985 Football (4A)
 2005 Baseball (4A)
 2008 Boys' Basketball (4A)
 2017 Wrestling

Fishers Tigers (4)
 2008 Boys' Cross Country
 2010 Football (5A)
 2014 Girls' Soccer
 2018 Baseball (4A)

Franklin Central Flashes (5)
 1998 Boys’ Cross County
 1981 Football (2A)
 1982 Football (2A)
 1983 Football (2A)
 1990 Football (4A)

Hamilton Southeastern Royals (13)
 1981 Football (A)
 2003 Girls' Golf
 2007 Boys' Swimming
 2007 Softball (4A)
 2008 Girls' Golf
 2010 Girls' Golf
 2010 Softball (4A)
 2011 Girls' Golf
 2013 Boys' Track
 2018 Girls' Track
 2019 Girls' Basketball (4A)
 2019 Baseball (4A)
 2022 Volleyball (4A)

Noblesville Millers (15)
 1913 Boys' Track
 1986 Girls' Golf
 1987 Girls' Basketball
 1987 Girls' Golf
 1991 Girls' Soccer
 1998 Boys' Golf
 1999 Boys' Golf
 2014 Baseball
 2019 Girls' Soccer (3A)
 2020 Girls' Soccer (3A)
 2021 Boys' Soccer (3A)
 2022 Girls' Basketball (4A)
 2022 Girls' Cross Country
 2022 Boys' Soccer (3A)
 2022 Girls' Soccer (3A)

Westfield Shamrocks (8)
 1998 Girls' Cross Country
 2005 Girls' Cross Country
 2006 Girls' Cross Country
 2007 Girls' Cross Country
 2013 Boys' Golf
 2015 Boys' Golf
 2016 Boys' Golf
 2016 Football (5A)

Zionsville Eagles (11)
 1987 Football (3A)
 1996 Football (3A)
 2002 Boys' Golf
 2004 Boys' Golf
 2009 Boys' Soccer
 2017 Girls' Golf
 2017 Girls' Cross Country
 2019 Boys' Soccer
 2019 Boys' Tennis
 2020 Boys' Tennis
 2021 Boys' Tennis

See also
 Hoosier Hysteria
 Largest high school gyms in the United States

References

External links

Indiana high school athletic conferences